Hufschmid may refer to:

 , American author of the 2002 book Painful Questions: An Analysis of the September 11th Attack.
 Ernst Hufschmid (handballer) (1910–?), Swiss field handball player
 Willy Hufschmid (born 1918), Swiss field handball player
 Patrick Hufschmid (born 1976), luthier - Hufschmid Guitars Switzerland
 Ernst Hufschmid (footballer) (1913–2002), Swiss footballer